John Fane  (6 January 17518 February 1824),  of Wormsley near Watlington, Oxfordshire, was a British Tory politician who represented  Oxfordshire in eight successive Parliaments. He was also a magistrate and president of the Oxfordshire Agricultural Society.

Background
Fane was the son of Henry Fane (a younger brother of Thomas Fane, 8th Earl of Westmorland). His mother was Charlotte, daughter of Richard Luther, of Miles near Ongar in Essex.

Political career
Fane was returned to Parliament for Oxfordshire in 1796, 1802, 1806, 1807, 1812, 1818, and 1820. He was created D.C.L. Oxford 28 June 1797. Appointed Major of the Oxfordshire Militia on 4 June 1803, but not so in 1807, and Lieutenant Colonel Commandant 2nd Oxfordshire (Local) Militia 24 April 1809.

Fane was a Tory independent who supported the government Ministers when they did things he perceived to be in the national interest, but was opposed to government patronage grants and pensions to its own supporters, and he never sought or obtained, a place or pension for himself or his family. He managed his estates prudently, and did not spend money on vices or foreign travel and except when called to London by his Parliamentary duties, stayed his own country-seat amongst his tenantry. He was upright, and inflexibly impartial when exercising his magisterial duties at the Assizes and the Sessions.

Family
Fane married Lady Elizabeth, daughter of Thomas Parker, 3rd Earl of Macclesfield, in 1773. He died in February 1824, aged 73. His wife survived him by five years and died in June 1829. His eldest son John inherited his estates.

Children:
Elizabeth Sarah
Charlotte (1787–1869) (who was the mother of John Fane Charles Hamilton)
Georgiana  (d. 15 June 1864), wife to J. W. Henley. (The Rt. Rev. Charles de Salis was one of her grandsons).
Augusta
John Fane (9 July 1775 – 4 October 1850)
Rear-Admiral Francis William Fane (1778–1844)

Notes

References

External links 

 

1751 births
1824 deaths
British MPs 1796–1800
Members of the Parliament of Great Britain for English constituencies
Members of the Parliament of the United Kingdom for English constituencies
UK MPs 1801–1802
UK MPs 1802–1806
UK MPs 1806–1807
UK MPs 1807–1812
UK MPs 1812–1818
UK MPs 1818–1820
UK MPs 1820–1826
John